The Tizen Association, formerly the LiMo Foundation (short for Linux Mobile), is a non-profit consortium which develops and maintains the Tizen mobile operating system. Tizen is a Linux-based operating system for smartphones and other mobile devices. The founding members were Motorola, NEC, NTT DoCoMo, Panasonic Mobile Communications, Samsung Electronics, and Vodafone. The consortium's work resulted in the LiMo Platform—which was integrated into mobile phone products from NEC, Panasonic and Samsung—and later became the Tizen platform.

Members
Members of the Tizen Association are:

Phones
Phones using LiMo include:

LiMo & Tizen

In the end of September 2011 it was announced by the Linux Foundation that MeeGo will be totally replaced by the Tizen mobile operating system project during 2012. Tizen will be a new free and open source Linux-based operating-system which itself will not be released until the first quarter of 2012. Intel and Samsung, in collaboration with the LiMo Foundation and assisting MeeGo developers, have been pointed out to lead the development of this new software platform, using third-party developer frameworks that will primarily be built on the HTML5 and other web standards. As of October 2012, the LiMo website traffic is redirected to tizen.org.

See also

 Linux Phone Standards Forum
 Android (operating system) from Google
 MeeGo Operating System from Nokia and Intel (former Maemo and Moblin)
 Openmoko
 Symbian Foundation
 Open Handset Alliance

References

 https://archive.today/20130127214730/http://www.linuxdevices.com/news/NS8711151732.html

External links
 
 
 Coming Battle Over Open Source Phones

Linux organizations
Mobile Linux
Organizations established in 2007